The Bluecoats Drum and Bugle Corps, or simply The Bluecoats, is a World Class competitive drum and bugle corps. Based in Canton, Ohio, the Bluecoats are a member corps of Drum Corps International (DCI). The Bluecoats were the 2016 Drum Corps International World Class Champions.

History

The Bluecoats Drum and Bugle Corps was founded in 1972 by Canton businessman Art Drukenbrod and Canton Police officers "Babe" Stearn and Ralph McCauley (the head and assistant directors of the Canton Police Boys' Club). The corps members chose the name both because of their sponsorship and to honor the city's police officers, particularly those who had retired from the ranks. The corps made its competition debut in 1974 and, in their first major show, finished thirty-second of thirty-seven corps in the U.S. Open Class A prelims in Marion, Ohio. The corps improved year by year, and began touring in both the U.S. and Canada and making U.S. Open finals in 1976, taking second place in 1977 and third in 1978. The Bluecoats made their first DCI appearance in Denver, Colorado in 1977, scoring thirty-fifth place among forty-five corps.

Although the corps was maturing musically, it was struggling to survive financially. In 1979, the corps only performed at local parades, as it attempted to reorganize its financial situation. With the return to the field in 1980, the corps was competitive in Class A competitions but only managed a thirty-eighth-place finish of the forty-four corps performing in Open Class at the DCI World Championships. In the next two seasons, the corps attempted to compete exclusively in Open Class, but they met with small success. In 1983, it was announced that the Bluecoats Drum and Bugle Corps would cease operations.

At the time that the corps' folding was announced, present-day corps President Scott Swaldo was a marching member. When he told his father, Canton industrialist Ted Swaldo, the elder Swaldo took over as director. Under the new director, the corps returned to the field after only a one-year hiatus. As a full-fledged Open Class corps, the Bluecoats improved with each passing year until, in 1987, the corps became the first corps from Ohio to earn a place in the DCI World Championship finals, finishing in eleventh place. Since then, the corps has failed to make finals only once in 1999.

In 2010, the corps medaled for the first time at the DCI World Championships, taking the bronze with their production "Metropolis: The Future Is Now". In 2014, they once again took home the silver medal for their show "TILT", which is now cited as one of the most influential shows in the marching arts.

In 2016, the Bluecoats won first place in World Class Finals, becoming only the tenth corps to be DCI Champions since the competition began in 1972. The winning show, "Down Side Up", earned the corps' highest score (at the time) of 97.650 while winning the General Effect and Music captions. For 2016, the Bluecoats abandoned their traditional uniforms in favor of a more informal costume designed with the show's near-constant motion in mind; the brass and percussion wore white and the color guard yellow, both with a swirling, sequined blue accent stripe running from the left hand to the shoulder, across the chest, and down the right leg; Bluecoats also became the first corps to win the DCI title while not wearing any type of headgear. This trend of non-traditional uniforms has continued since then, and has been emulated by numerous other corps since.

At the 2019 DCI World Championships, the Bluecoats came second place while scoring the corps' highest ever score of 98.238. Post-COVID the activity resumed competitions in 2022 with Bluecoats landing in 2nd place for the third time since 2014.  They also attained medalist standing for the sixth time in seven competition years, a feat to which only one other corps can currently attest.

Celebrating its 50th Anniversary in 2022, the organization also produced an Alumni Corps that performed at the Drum Corps International semi-finals.

Show summary (1974–2022)

Caption awards
At the annual World Championship Finals, Drum Corps International (DCI) presents awards to the corps with the high average scores from prelims, semifinals, and finals in five captions. The Bluecoats have won these captions:

Don Angelica Best General Effect Award
  2016, 2019

Fred Sanford Best Percussion Performance Award

  2022

Traditions

Blooooo...
At the Bluecoats first appearance at DCI Finals in 1987, their over-the-top arrangement of the "Autumn Leaves" brought forth the spontaneous long shouts from the audience of "Bloooo..."– a crowd reaction that began with one former member during the 1985 and 1986 seasons and amplified by Drum Corps Midwest announcer Joe Bruno and grew throughout the 1987 season. This has since come to be the audience's traditional greeting as the corps enters the field and response as they finish their show, which has become one of the most recognizable acts of audience participation in the drum corps activity.

Corps song
The Bluecoats' corps song is, "Autumn Leaves", which became the corps' song after the 1987 season, in honor of the corps making its first Finals appearance. The song has remained a part of the corps' repertoire since 1987, and it reappeared in their 1988 and 1998 shows.

Home show
Like most drum corps, the Bluecoats hold an annual home show near their hometown, usually in Massillon, Ohio. Through 2018 it was a local tradition that the Bluecoats' home show is a part of the induction festivities for Pro Football Hall of Fame, which is located in Canton. In 2019, the corps performed during halftime for the Pro Football Hall of Fame Game.

References

External links
Official website

Drum Corps International World Class corps
Canton, Ohio
Musical groups established in 1972
1972 establishments in Ohio